Jiro Yamagata (January 6, 1881 – January 9, 1936) was a Japanese politician who served as governor of Hiroshima Prefecture from October 1923 to September 1925. He was governor of Ishikawa Prefecture (1922-1923), Hyōgo Prefecture (1925-1927) and Kanagawa Prefecture (1929–1931).

References

Governors of Hiroshima
1881 births
1936 deaths
Japanese Home Ministry government officials
Governors of Ishikawa Prefecture
Governors of Hyōgo Prefecture
Governors of Kanagawa Prefecture